Türksat 5B is a Turkish geostationary high-throughput (HTS) communications satellite of Türksat A.Ş. developed for military and commercial purposes, and was launched on 19 December 2021, at 03:58:39 UTC.

Development 
The Türksat 5B project started in September 2011. The final production contract for the Turkish Aerospace Industries (TAI) was planned for 2015. After a delay, the contract was realized in October 2017 when Airbus Defence and Space was selected to join the project with the requirement that 25% of the satellite be built in Turkey in order to stimulate the technological sector of the Turkish economy.

In November 2020, it was announced that satellite level tests for Türksat 5B have begun.

Launch 
The satellite was launched with a Falcon 9 launch vehicle of SpaceX at Cape Canaveral, Florida, on 19 December 2021 at 03:58:39 UTC. The first-stage booster used on this mission was B1067, making its third flight; the first stage was successfully recovered on the drone ship A Shortfall of Gravitas.

Spacecraft 
Türksat 5B is a communications satellite to serve on a geostationary orbit at 42° East longitude. It was built on a Eurostar-3000EOR satellite bus manufactured by Airbus Defence and Space. Powered by two deployable solar panels and batteries at 15 kW, the 50 Gbps high-throughput satellite consists of Ku-band, Ka-band and X-band transponders.

The 3 military X-band transponders have global coverage and were developed by Aselsan for use by the Turkish Presidency of Defense Industries (SSB/SSM).

See also 

 Türksat 5A

References 

Communications satellites of Turkey
Satellites using the Spacebus bus
SpaceX commercial payloads
Communications satellites in geostationary orbit
High throughput satellites
Spacecraft launched in 2021
2021 in Turkey